Ward 13 were a short lived Australian new wave band formed in 1980. The group released one studio album in 1981.

Discography

Albums

EPs/ Mini albums

Singles

References

Australian pop music groups
Musical groups established in 1980
Musical groups disestablished in 1983